Frey, Frei, Fray, Frej, Freij, Freyr or Freÿr is the given name of the following people

Freyr Alexandersson (born 1982), Icelandic football coach and former player
Frei Caneca (1779–1825), Brazilian religious leader, politician, and journalist
Frei Galvão (1739–1822), also known as Saint Anthony of St. Ann Galvão, was a Brazilian friar of the Franciscan Order
Frej Larsson (born 1983), Swedish musician and rapper
Frej Liewendahl (1902–1966), Finnish runner
Frej Lindqvist (born 1937), Swedish actor
Frej Ossiannilsson (1905–1995), Swedish entomologist
Frey Svenson (1866–1927), Swedish doctor
Frei Otto (1925–2015), German architect and structural engineer
Frei Tito (1945–1974), Brazilian Roman Catholic friar